Hunan University of Science and Engineering is a university located in Yongzhou, Hunan, China.
The university consists of 16 departments, with 38 specialties for undergraduates.

History
Hunan University of Science and Engineering was formed in 1941, it was initially called "Hunan Provincial Seventh Normal School".

In 1971, it started a college education.

In 2000, it upgraded to undergraduate course university and renamed "Lingling College".

In 2004, Lingling College renamed "Hunan University of Science and Engineering".

Academics
 Department of Music
 Department of Art
 Department of Law
 Department of Physical 
 Department of Electronic engineering 
 Department of Journalism and Communication
 Department of Chinese language and Literature
 Department of Civil Engineering and Construction management 
 Department of English language
 Department of Mathematics and Computer Science 
 Department of Economic management 
 Department of Information Technology and Education
 Department of Life Science and Chemical Engineering
 Department of Computer communication engineering 
 Department of Political science

Culture
 Motto:

References

External links

Hunan University of Science and Engineering
Universities and colleges in Hunan
Educational institutions established in 1941
Yongzhou
1941 establishments in China